Author Meets the Critics was an American talk show which was broadcast by the National Broadcasting Company, American Broadcasting Company, and the DuMont Television Network. The series began as a mid-season replacement on NBC on April 4, 1948, but was transferred to ABC during 1949. The show was transferred back to NBC during 1951, and then to DuMont from January 10, 1952, to October 10, 1954.

Overview
On the series, two literary critics debated a recently published book, one in favor and the other against. Later, the author of the book appeared to meet the critics. Columnist Jack Gaver outlined the concept in his column "Up and Down Broadway, in 1946: "The author of a current best-seller is tossed in with a couple of guest critics and a commentator and, if he survives 30 minutes of unscripted pro and con, may decide never to write another book. Sometimes the boys get rough and lucky is the writer who draws a couple of critics of such opposed views that they go after each other instead of him."

John K. M. McCaffery was the moderator from 1948 to 1951. Faye Emerson had a brief stint as moderator during 1952, during which the show was transferred to prime time. Virgilia Peterson was the moderator during the DuMont run from 1952 to 1954, when the show was broadcast Thursdays at 10pm EST.

The DuMont episodes of the series were produced by Phyllis Adams Jenkins (1923-2004), a pioneer in providing serious programming intended for daytime television audiences. She later produced other series, including What's the Problem?, the daytime series Home featuring Arlene Francis during the 1950s, and Dinah Shore's daytime series during the 1960s.

On his series, Ernie Kovacs parodied it as "Author Heats the Critics", with the author attacking the critics, rather than the other way around.

Broadcast history

Martin Stone first proposed producing the program in 1940, but radio executives found the concept "too highbrow"; the program was first conceived of by Stone and "Albany newspaper man" Richard Lewis. It first made air in December 1940, on an Albany station, before moving to Schenectady, and then to New York City. (It was on the AM radio station WHN in New York City, by 1942.) Stone produced the program remotely during much of this era, as he was serving as general counsel for the Lend-Lease Administration and in the United States Navy, during World War II.

After six years on local stations, national radio broadcaster Mutual network began airing the program. It carried the series on radio from June 12, 1946 to April 2, 1947. It was sponsored by the Book-of-the-Month club, on Mutual. In summer 1946, Stone left Mutual "under agreement", airing the show on WQXR on Thursdays with the club sponsorship, and on Mutual without sponsorship. On May 20, Mutual filled his old time slot with Books on Trial, a series sponsored by the Literary Guild, featuring a "prosecuting attorney and jury." Stone took the situation to court, alleging appropriation and effort to confuse. Stone lost in court, as State Supreme Court Justice Bernard Botein found no conflict of ideas.

NBC debuted the series as a weekly radio program, on Sundays, beginning June 1, 1947. By that point, "almost 1,000 of the world's top-flight authors and other literary figures" had appeared on the program. In one episode before NBC, author Gontran de Poncins walked out on a debate about Kabloona.

The series began as a mid-season replacement on NBC on April 4, 1948, but was transferred to ABC during 1949. The show was transferred back to NBC during 1951, and then to DuMont from January 10, 1952, to October 10, 1954.

Episode status
As with most DuMont series, not many episodes of the DuMont version are known to survive. The March 27, 1949, episode of original NBC version of the series is preserved from kinescope recordings at the Paley Center for Media in New York City.

See also
List of programs broadcast by the DuMont Television Network
List of surviving DuMont Television Network broadcasts

Bibliography
David Weinstein, The Forgotten Network: DuMont and the Birth of American Television (Philadelphia: Temple University Press, 2004) 
Alex McNeil, Total Television, Fourth edition (New York: Penguin Books, 1980) 
Tim Brooks and Earle Marsh, The Complete Directory to Prime Time Network TV Shows, Third edition (New York: Ballantine Books, 1964)

References

External links

producer Phyllis Adams Jenkins
DuMont historical website

1940 radio programme debuts
1948 American television series debuts
1954 American television series endings
American Broadcasting Company original programming
1940s American television talk shows
1950s American television talk shows
Black-and-white American television shows
DuMont Television Network original programming
English-language television shows
Lost television shows
NBC original programming
Literary criticism